Yerington High School is a public high school in Yerington, Nevada, United States, a town southeast of Carson City, Nevada. Hundreds of students are enrolled as of 2020.

Academics
As of 2013, Yerington High School operates on an 8:00 a.m. to 2:50 p.m. schedule. The only exception is on Friday that the school starts at 8:00 a.m. and ends at 1:45 p.m. This includes seven periods of instruction and lunch.

Enrollment
Yerington High School has had an enrollment of about 468 students in 2010-11 school year and 367 in 2015-16.  Yerington High School is very integrated in the school years of 2011-2012 with, 13.8% American Indian/Alaska Native, 2.3% Asian, 31.7% Hispanic, 0.5% Black, and 50% White.

Athletics
Currently, Yerington High School offers its students 10 sport teams. These sports include golf baseball, softball, basketball, football, wrestling, volleyball, track, soccer, and cross country.
Volleyball state champions: 2006 2007 2008 2010 2011 2013 2014 2015 2019

References

External links

Yerington High School website
Lyon County School District

Public high schools in Nevada
Education in Lyon County, Nevada